Prijatelju kočnice ti ne rade baš sve (My Friend Your Brakes are not Completely Working) is the debut live album by the Serbian indie/alternative rock band Obojeni Program released by the Serbian independent record label Sorabia Disk in 1993 on compact cassette only, and consists mostly of the live versions of the material from the first two studio albums, Najvažnije je biti zdrav and Ovaj zid stoji krivo released in 1990 and 1991.

Track listing 
All lyrics and music by Obojeni Program.

Personnel 
The band
 Branislav Babić "Kebra" — vocals
 Danica Milovanov "Daca" — vocals, backing vocals
 Dragan Knežević — guitar, backing vocals
 Jovan Pejić — drums

Additional personnel (Boye members)
 Ilija Vlaisavljević "Bebec" — bass guitar
 Biljana Babić — vocals, backing vocals
 Jelena Katjez — vocals, backing vocals

References 
 Prijatelju kočnice ti ne rade baš sve at Discogs
 EX YU ROCK enciklopedija 1960-2006, Janjatović Petar; 
 NS rockopedija, novosadska rock scena 1963-2003, Mijatović Bogomir, SWITCH, 2005

Obojeni Program albums
1992 live albums